Koptsevo is a rural locality (a village) in Slednevskoye Rural Settlement, Alexandrovsky District, Vladimir Oblast, Russia. The population was 46 as of 2010. There are 2 streets.

Geography 
Koptsevo is located on the Gorely Krest River, 16 km west of Alexandrov (the district's administrative centre) by road. Strunino is the nearest rural locality.

References 

Rural localities in Alexandrovsky District, Vladimir Oblast